Illawalla was an Edwardian single-story building in the Skippool area of Thornton, Lancashire, England. Built in 1902, it was demolished in 1996, after lying derelict for six years, to make way for three exclusive homes. Its name is preserved in the name of the road on which these houses now stand (The Illawalla) and also in the name of the adjacent cricket club (Thornton Cleveleys Cricket Club Illawalla), whose grounds partly occupy the land Illawalla stood on.

Illawalla in Aboriginal Australian means the house of plenty. It is believed Frederick J. Emery, one of the early owners of the property, gave it this name to reflect his spell as a government official in Australia.

History
Illawalla's architects were Tom Wilson Fairbrother and Charles Llewelyn Hall, of Fairbrother & Hall in Poulton-le-Fylde.

The building's foundation stone was laid by Vesta Tilley on 12 June 1902. Tilley was appearing at Blackpool's Alhambra Theatre, whose chairman was Charles V. Howarth, the Illawalla's first owner. Upon completion, it was the largest bungalow in Europe.

According to a Blackpool Times article from 21 June 1902:

One of the rooms featured a plaster frieze depicting wading birds along the nearby River Wyre.

Haworth lived with his wife at Illawalla up to his death in 1920. His widow continued to live there for several subsequent years.

It was next acquired by Ernest Broadbelt, a wholesale fruit merchant from Manchester. He was its owner during the late 1920s and 1930s.

In 1942, it was bought by Frederick J. Emery, but he was unable to move into the building for three years because it was being used by the British Army as a transit camp. It was later taken over by the Home Guard. Later in World War II it became a home run by the Ministry of Health for pregnant evacuees. In the early 1950s, Emery leased the land overlooking the River Wyre to the local cricket club, who remain there today.

Several of the interior scenes for the 1977 film Valentino were shot in Illawalla's sunken entrance hall.

For the final years of its existence, after failing in an attempt to become a gentlemen's club, it instead became a nightclub.

Emmanuel Christian School in Fleetwood inquired about taking over Illawalla in 1995, but Wyre Borough Council rejected the plan amid fears of the close proximity of an underground pipeline carrying ethylene to ICI Hillhouse in Thornton.

The building was demolished in April 1996, after lying derelict for six years, to make way for three luxury homes. Only two carved stone pillars remain on the site. They are used at the entrance to the current development. Many parts of the building were salvaged and are now used privately.

References in popular culture
Glyn Bailey & the Many Splendid Things wrote "The Old Illawalla" about the building. It is the opening track on the 2010 album The Disturbance. The opening line of the song is: "There once stood, at the edge of town, an Edwardian pile of great renown, but in '96 we pulled it down". Three years earlier Bailey released an album called Songs from the Old Illawalla.

Gallery

References

External links
A gallery of photos of The Illawalla

Buildings and structures in the Borough of Wyre
The Fylde
Edwardian architecture
Houses completed in 1902
Buildings and structures demolished in 1996
Demolished buildings and structures in England